Cima di Piancabella is a mountain of the Swiss Lepontine Alps, overlooking Malvaglia in the canton of Ticino. It is located south of the Cima di Gana Bianca.

References

External links
 Cima di Piancabella on Hikr

Mountains of the Alps
Mountains of Switzerland
Mountains of Ticino
Lepontine Alps